Freddy Ivan Ruiz (born November 11, 1993) is an American soccer player.

Career

College & Semi Professional
Ruiz played four years of college soccer at the University of Alabama at Birmingham between 2012 and 2015.

While at UAB, Ruiz appeared for Premier Development League clubs Ocala Stampede and Orlando City U-23.

Professional

Ruiz went undrafted in the 2016 MLS SuperDraft, later signing with United Soccer League side Arizona United on March 23, 2016.

References

1993 births
Living people
American soccer players
UAB Blazers men's soccer players
Ocala Stampede players
Orlando City U-23 players
Phoenix Rising FC players
Association football forwards
Soccer players from Alabama
USL League Two players
USL Championship players
Sportspeople from Rome, Georgia